The following is a list of senators and members of the various editions of the lower house of the Philippine legislature who died while they were serving their terms.

Senate

Philippine Legislature (1907-1935)

National Assembly (1935-1941)

House of Representatives (1941-1972)

Batasang Pambansa (1978-1986)

House of Representatives (1987-present)

References

Filipino legislators
Lists of Filipino politicians
Congress of the Philippines
Deaths in the Philippines
Philippine legislators